Nicole Bruno (born 26 January 1971) is a former professional tennis player from Italy.

Career
Bruno, with countryman Massimo Ardinghi, competed in the men's doubles at the 1996 Wimbledon Championships. They defeated Scott Draper and Javier Sánchez in the opening round, before losing to the Dutch pairing of Tom Kempers and Tom Nijssen in the second round.

He was a doubles quarter-finalist, with Gianluca Pozzi, at the 1996 Japan Open Tennis Championships. This was his best result on the ATP Tour, but he did win four Challenger doubles titles.

Challenger titles

Singles: (1)

Doubles: (4)

References

1971 births
Living people
Italian male tennis players
Sportspeople from the Province of Lodi